Universidad Autónoma de Asunción may refer to:

Universidad Autónoma de Asunción (football), Paraguayan women's football team
Universidad Autónoma de Asunción (fútsal), Paraguayan fútsal team
Universidad Autónoma de Asunción (university), private university in Asuncion